Coryphocera is a genus of beetles in the family Scarabaeidae. Species are found in Senegal.

References

External links 

 
 Coryphocera at insectoid.info

Scarabaeidae genera
Dynastinae